Edgewood, also known as the Charles Sharpless House, is a historic home located in Birmingham Township, Chester County, Pennsylvania. It was built about 1846, and is a -story, serpentine structure in the Victorian Gothic style.  After 1873, it was remodeled and a four-story tower added.

It was added to the National Register of Historic Places in 1973.

References

Houses on the National Register of Historic Places in Pennsylvania
Gothic Revival architecture in Pennsylvania
Houses completed in 1846
Houses in Chester County, Pennsylvania
National Register of Historic Places in Chester County, Pennsylvania